The Nepean Creative and Performing Arts High School (formerly Nepean High School) is a government-funded co-educational comprehensive and specialist secondary day school with speciality in performing arts, located in Emu Plains, a suburb in western Sydney, New South Wales, Australia. The school is located adjacent to the Emu Plains railway station.

Overview
Nepean Creative and Performing Arts High School was founded in 1963 and became a creative and performing arts school in 2011, and provides an education for students from Year 7 to Year 12. The school is open to many including local students, auditioned students and students in the special education program. In 2010 the number of students attending the school was above 500. Since the CAPA program was started that number has risen to over 1,000. The school's motto is "Aspire the Heights".

Animal cruelty attacks

In 2009 the school was the target of several attacks on its agricultural areas; a goat, several chickens and other animals were killed and/or mutilated. The perpetrators were not identified; however, sympathy was shown from all across the region and a walk-a-thon helped raise funds to replace the animals and improve security.

School achievements
Nepean Creative and Performing Arts High School has been very involved in the Penrith and Emu Plains community. This includes, but is not limited to:
Supporting the agriculture community by being involved in the Royal Sydney Easter show and the Penrith show. The school agriculture group also sells local fruits, vegetables and animal products that are produced by the school. 
Being involved in School Spectacular, with many students becoming featured artists
Producing school musicals
Being involved in many different performing arts events across the city (e.g. PULSE, State dance and drama)
Creating various CAPA showcases each year
The creation of the charity, "Dingo Thursday", led by students which is aimed at rehabilitating homeless people after the students met a young homeless man with the nickname "Whiskers".

See also 

 List of government schools in New South Wales
 List of selective high schools in New South Wales
 List of creative and performing arts high schools in New South Wales

References

External links
 School website

Public high schools in Sydney
Emu Plains, New South Wales
1963 establishments in Australia
Educational institutions established in 1963
Creative and performing arts high schools in New South Wales